Meribeth Elliott Cameron (May 22, 1905 in Ingersoll, Ontario, Canada – July 12, 1997 in Holyoke, Massachusetts) was an American historian of China and academic who served as the 14th (Acting) President of Mount Holyoke College from 1968-1969.

She was a professor of Chinese History at Mount Holyoke from 1948-1970.  She served as Dean and briefly as Acting President in 1954 (during the period of President Ham) and 1966 (during the period of President Gettell).

Academic training and career
Cameron graduated from Santa Monica High School in Santa Monica, California in 1921 and was awarded a B.A. from Stanford University in 1925 and an M.A. in 1926. While at Stanford she was a member of Phi Beta Kappa and studied the history of East Asia. She took a M.A. degree in history at Radcliffe College in 1927, then returned to Stanford to finish her dissertation, "The Reform Movement in China, 1898-1912," for which she was awarded a Ph.D. in History and Political Science in 1928.

She then taught at Reed College (1928-1934), Flora Stone Mather College of Western Reserve University (1934-1937). She was Dean of the College and Professor of history at Milwaukee-Downer College (1941-1948), and in 1948 Academic Dean and Professor of history at Mount Holyoke College, where she remained until she retired in 1970.

During these years she was a productive historian of China. She was one of the founding editors of Far Eastern Quarterly (later called The Journal of Asian Studies), of which she was book review editor 1941-1951. She contributed to the basic reference for Qing dynasty history, Eminent Chinese of the Ch'ing Period (1943). Among her journal articles and books were The Reform Movement in China, 1898-1912 and a co-authored book, China, Japan and the Powers.

Selected works

References

1905 births
1997 deaths
Mount Holyoke College faculty
Presidents and Principals of Mount Holyoke College
Stanford University alumni
Radcliffe College alumni
People from Ingersoll, Ontario
American sinologists
Historians of China
Women heads of universities and colleges
Reed College faculty
Milwaukee-Downer College faculty
American women historians
20th-century American historians
Women orientalists
20th-century American women educators
20th-century American educators
Canadian emigrants to the United States
20th-century American academics